Cowgills Corner (also known as Cowgill's Corner) is an unincorporated community in Kent County, Delaware, United States. The Octagonal Schoolhouse, which is listed on the National Register of Historic Places, is located in Cowgills Corner.

History
Cowgills Corner's population was 36 in 1900.

References

Unincorporated communities in Kent County, Delaware
Unincorporated communities in Delaware